Leah Christine McSweeney (born August 27, 1982) is an American fashion designer and television personality. She founded the women's streetwear line Married to the Mob in 2004, and has starred on the reality television series The Real Housewives of New York City from 2020 to 2021.

Early life 
McSweeney was born in Manhattan to Bryan & Bernadette "Bunny" McSweeney and raised in an Irish-Italian family. She attended the Convent of the Sacred Heart Catholic all-girls school in the Upper East Side. After being expelled at 14, her family moved to Newtown, Connecticut.

In 2002, McSweeney suffered several injuries in a physical altercation with the New York Police Department.

She, along with streetwear designer Rob Cristofaro, used her $75,000 settlement to create Married to the Mob, a line of feminine streetwear.

Career

Married to the Mob 
Married to the Mob (MTTM) has made several collaborations since its initiation. Amongst its first major collaborations featured a Kangol cashmere 'beanie' cap and a Kaws two-piece graphic swimsuit. Later, MTTM would collaborate with German accessory brand MCM, and French boutique Colette for a limited-edition Reebok lip-print sneaker. MTTM would later create another limited-edition sneaker with Nike. MTTM have also collaborated with French graffiti artist Fafi, Krink, and Jessy "Nite Rider" Kennedy. MTTM has also released collections with models including Chanel West Coast, Kid Sister, Lil Debbie, and the Clermont twins.

Reality television 
In 2010, McSweeney appeared as a client on an episode on Bravo's The Millionaire Matchmaker. Her appearance on Matchmaker was well received by critics, and has led to appearances and cameos on other television programs, including VH1's Love & Hip Hop: New York.

McSweeney was first speculated to be joining the cast of The Real Housewives of New York City after being seen filming with cast member Tinsley Mortimer in August 2019. She was confirmed to have joined the series during an appearance at Bravo's "BravoCon" fan convention in November 2019. McSweeney was referred to production by former cast member Bethenny Frankel, who left the series after the previous season.

McSweeney has officially signed on for her second season as a full-time cast member of The Real Housewives of New York City. McSweeney held off on renewing her contract until she was offered a higher salary, being paid only $3,000 an episode during her season 12 stint.

Other projects 
In 2015, McSweeney became a featured recurring star on Shade 45's Lip Service with Angela Yee of Power 105.1. The following year, she began Improper Etiquette with Laura Stylez of Hot 97. On the podcast, McSweeney and Stylez provide candid perspectives and advice on lifestyle and current issues with occasional celebrity interviews.

McSweeney has been a frequent contributor to the online publication Hypebeast, where she offers commentary on wellness, streetwear style, and motherhood. She also writes an advice column for Penthouse magazine.

On June 27, 2018, McSweeney wrote a controversial article for Penthouse titled Can We Talk About Toxic Femininity? where she criticized #MeToo Movement pioneers Rose McGowan and Asia Argento. McSweeney received wide backlash and harsh judgement for her op-ed piece.

Personal life 
McSweeney gave birth to her only child with Cristofaro, daughter Kier Marie, in 2007.

Filmography

See also 

 List of American fashion designers
 List of fashion topics

References

External links 
 
 

1982 births
American fashion designers
Living people
The Real Housewives cast members
American women fashion designers
21st-century American women